Gujrat , is a town and union council of Mianwali District in the Punjab province of Pakistan. It is part of Piplan Tehsil and is located at 32°21'2N 71°17'27E and has an altitude of 186 m (613 ft).

References

Union councils of Mianwali District
Populated places in Mianwali District